The Pleasure Garden is a 1925 British-German silent drama film directed by Alfred Hitchcock in his feature film directorial debut. Based on the 1923 novel by Oliver Sandys, the film is about two chorus girls at the Pleasure Garden Theatre in London and their troubled relationships.

Plot
Jill, a young dancer, arrives in London with a letter of introduction to Mr. Hamilton, proprietor of the Pleasure Garden Theatre. The letter and all her money are stolen from her handbag as she waits to see him. Patsy, a chorus girl at the Pleasure Garden, sees her difficulty and offers to take her to her own lodgings and to try to get her a job. Next morning Jill is successful in getting a part in the show. Her fiancé, Hugh, arrives with a colleague called Levet. Hugh and Patsy become very close while Jill is being pursued by a number of rich men, eventually breaking up with Hugh in order to begin a relationship with the wealthy Prince Ivan. Not long after this, Hugh is sent to Africa by his company.

Jill moves out of the lodgings she shares with Patsy and becomes more involved with the Prince. As she becomes more successful and used to the rich and famous lifestyle she also becomes more dismissive of Patsy, shunning her and eventually seeing her as a commoner. As Patsy laments the loss of her friend, she is comforted by Levet who convinces her to enter into marriage with him. The couple honeymoon in Italy before he leaves to join Hugh in Africa. After some time Patsy finally receives a letter from her husband in which he says he has been sick for weeks. Patsy is determined to go to take care of him and asks Jill to lend her the fare. Jill refuses as she is preparing for her marriage to the Prince and has no money to spare. Patsy is able to borrow the fare from her landlords Mr and Mrs Sidey. When she arrives at her husband's bungalow, she finds that he is having an affair with a local woman and leaves. Levet tries to drive the woman away but when she refuses to leave him, follows her into the sea and drowns her.

Meanwhile, Patsy has found that Hugh really is very ill with a fever and stays to take care of him. Hugh has since discovered from a newspaper that Jill is to marry the Prince and he and Patsy soon realize that they love each other. Levet finds them together and accuses Hugh of making advances to his wife. Patsy agrees to follow Levet back to his bungalow in order to save Hugh. During the night, Levet is stricken with guilt and paranoia over the murder of his mistress and begins seeing ghostly visions of her. Levet becomes convinced that the ghost of his mistress will not stop haunting him until he murders Patsy too. Levet corners Patsy with a sword but he is shot dead before he can kill her. Hugh and Patsy find consolation with each other and return to London.

Cast
 Virginia Valli as Patsy Brand
 Carmelita Geraghty as Jill Cheyne
 Miles Mander as Levet
 John Stuart as Hugh Fielding
 Ferdinand Martini as Mr. Sidey
 Florence Helminger as Mrs. Sidey
 Georg H. Schnell as Oscar Hamilton
 Karl Falkenberg as Prince Ivan
 Elizabeth Pappritz as Native Girl (uncredited)
 Louis Brody as Plantation Manager (uncredited)

Production
Hitchcock described the casting process thus:

Producer Michael Balcon allowed Hitchcock to direct the film when Graham Cutts, a jealous executive at Gainsborough Pictures, refused to let Hitchcock work on The Rat.

The film was shot in Italy (Alassio, Genoa and Lake Como) and Germany. Many misfortunes befell the cast and crew. When Gaetano Ventimiglia, the film's cinematographer, failed to declare the film stock to Italian customs officials, the team had to pay fines and buy new film, seriously depleting their budget.

For the only time in a British Hitchcock production, both lead actresses, Virginia Valli and Carmelita Geraghty, were American.

The film was shot in 1925 and shown briefly in London in April 1926. But it was not officially released in the UK until January 1927, just before Hitchcock's third film, The Lodger: A Story of the London Fog, became a hit in February 1927.

Production credits
The production credits on the film were as follows:
 Director - Alfred Hitchcock 
 Producer - Michael Balcon 
 Writing - Eliot Stannard (screenplay), Oliver Sandys (underlying novel)
 Assistant director - Alma Reville

Preservation and home video status
In June 2012, The Pleasure Garden and eight other silent Hitchcock films were restored by the British Film Institute. As a result, 20 minutes of missing footage was added to this film, including "the atmospheric color tinting of the period". A new score was commissioned for the restoration by young British composer Daniel Patrick Cohen and it has been performed live with the film many times around the world. It has not been released on home video due to a lack of funds to properly record the score.

The only official DVD release contains a poor quality edited version of the film by US collector Raymond Rohauer. Like Hitchcock's other British films, all of which are copyrighted worldwide, The Pleasure Garden has been heavily bootlegged on home video. At the end of 2021, The Pleasure Garden became the first Hitchcock film to enter the public domain in the United States but only in its non-restored, scoreless form. It will remain copyrighted in the rest of the world until the end of 2050.

Significance
According to critic Dave Kehr, The Pleasure Garden'''s opening scene stands like a virtual "clip reel of Hitchcock motifs to come". The first shot captures chorus girls descending a spiral staircase (see Vertigo); a man uses opera glasses to better appreciate a blonde chorus dancer (see Rear Window); and the same blonde, who at first appears erotically remote, later emerges as down-to-earth and approachable (see Family Plot'').

References

External links
 
 
 The Pleasure Garden at the British Film Institute's Screenonline
 Alfred Hitchcock Collectors’ Guide: The Pleasure Garden at Brenton Film

1925 films
Films based on British novels
Films directed by Alfred Hitchcock
British black-and-white films
British crime drama films
British silent feature films
Films produced by Erich Pommer
1925 crime drama films
1925 directorial debut films
Films set in London
Films shot at Bavaria Studios
1920s British films
Silent drama films
1920s English-language films